The 2015 Sun Belt Conference football season was the 15th college football season for the Sun Belt Conference.
During the 2015 season, eleven schools competed in Sun Belt football: Appalachian State, Arkansas State, Georgia State, Georgia Southern, Idaho, Louisiana–Lafayette, Louisiana–Monroe, New Mexico State, South Alabama, Texas State and Troy.

On September 1, 2015, it was announced that Coastal Carolina will join the Sun Belt Conference. They will compete in SBC football starting in 2017.

Previous season
The conference title was won by Georgia Southern, in its first year as both a Sun Belt member and an FBS program. The Eagles became only the third team to win a conference championship in their first FBS season. The other two schools to accomplish this feat were Nevada, Big West Conference champions in 1992, and Marshall, which won the Mid-American Conference crown in 1997. Georgia Southern also became the first team ever to go unbeaten in conference play in its first FBS season (both the 1992 Nevada and 1997 Marshall teams lost once in conference play).

Louisiana–Lafayette, South Alabama, and Arkansas State were all invited to bowl games. The SBC went 1–2 in bowls with the Ragin' Cajuns winning their 4th straight R+L Carriers New Orleans Bowl.

Preseason
The following preseason awards and honors were announced

Award watch lists
The following Sun Belt players were named to preseason award watch lists:

Walter Camp Award:
 Elijah McGuire – Louisiana-Lafayette

Lou Groza Award:
 Aleem Sunanon - South Alabama

Davey O'Brien Award:
 Fredi Knighten – Arkansas State

Mackey Award:
 Darion Griswold - Arkansas State
 Joel Ruiz - Georgia State

Ray Guy Award:
 Luke Ferguson - Arkansas State
 Austin Rehkow - Idaho

Rimington Trophy:
 Dalton Bennett - Troy
 Jesse Chapman - Appalachian State
 Joseph Scelfo - South Alabama

Manning Award:
 Fredi Knighten - Arkansas State
 Kevin Ellison – Georgia Southern

Thorpe Award:
 Doug Middleton – Appalachian State
 Mitch Lane – UL Monroe
 Montres Kitchens – Troy
 David Mims II – Texas State

Paul Hornung Award:
 Elijah McGuire - Louisiana-Lafayette
 Rashon Ceaser - UL Monroe
 Teldrick Morgan - New Mexico State

Lombardi Award:
 Ronald Blair - Appalachian State
 John Law - Appalachian State
 Ja’Von Rolland–Jones - Arkansas State
 Chris Stone - Arkansas State
 Darien Foreman - Georgia Southern
 Joseph Peterson - Georgia State
 Marc Millan - Idaho
 Mykhael Quave - Louisiana-Lafayettee
 Dominique Tovell - Louisiana-Lafayette
 Gerrand Johnson - UL Monroe
 Hunter Kissinger - UL Monroe
 Isaiah Folasa-Lutui - New Mexico State
 Chris May - South Alabama
 Joseph Scelfo - South Alabama
 Adrian Bellard - Texas State
 Dalton Bennett - Troy
 Tyler Roberts - Troy

Doak Walker Award:
 Marcus Cox - Appalachian State
 Michael Gordon – Arkansas State
 Matt Breida – Georgia Southern
 Elijah McGuire – Louisiana-Lafayette
 Robert Lowe – Texas State
 Brandon Burks – Troy

Biletnikoff Award:
 Donovan Harden – Georgia State
 Teldrick Morgan – New Mexico State
 Rashon Ceaser  – UL Monroe
 Ajalen Holley – UL Monroe

Sun Belt Media Day
Sun Belt Conference Media Day was held on July 20, 2015 in the Mercedes-Benz Superdome in New Orleans, Louisiana.

Preseason Offensive Player of the Year - Elijah McGuire (RB, Louisiana-Lafayette)
Preseason Defensive Player of the Year - David Mims (DB, Texas State)

Coaches Poll
 Georgia Southern - 110 (6)
 Louisiana-Lafayette - 108 (3)
 Arkansas State - 96 (1)
 Appalachian State - 82
 Texas State - 78
 South Alabama - 68 (1)
 UL Monroe - 59
 Troy - 39
 Georgia State - 32
 New Mexico State - 30
 Idaho - 24

Preseason All–Conference Team

Offense
QB Fredi Knighten (Arkansas State)
RB Matt Breida (Georgia Southern)
RB Elijah McGuire (Louisiana-Lafayette)
WR J. D. McKissic (Arkansas State)
WR Donovan Harden (Georgia State)
WR Rashon Ceaser (UL Monroe)
TE Joel Ruiz (Georgia State)
OL Jesse Chapman (Appalachian State)
OL Darien Foreman (Georgia Southern)
OL Chris May (South Alabama)
OL Joseph Scelfo (South Alabama)
OL Adrian Bellard (Texas State)

Defense
DL Chris Stone (Arkansas State)
DL Ronald Blair (Appalachian State)
DL Gerrand Johnson (UL Monroe)
DL Ja'Von Rolland-Jones (Arkansas State)
LB John Law (Appalachian State)
LB Xavier Woodson (Arkansas State)
LB Joseph Peterson (Georgia State)
DB Doug Middleton (Appalachian State)
DB Mitch Lane (UL Monroe)
DB David Mims II (Texas State)
DB Montres Kitchens (Troy)

Specialists
PK Aleem Sunanon (South Alabama)
P Austin Rehkow (Idaho)
RS Blaise Taylor (Arkansas State)

Coaches
Note: Stats shown are before the beginning of the season

Sun Belt vs. Power Five Conference matchups

Regular season

All dates, times, and TV are tentative and subject to change.

Start times are listed as Central Time Zone

Rankings reflect that of the AP poll for that week until Week 10 when the first CFP Poll is released.

Week 1

Players of the week:

Week 2

Players of the week:

Week 3

Open Week: Appalachian State, Louisiana-Lafayette, UL Monroe

Players of the week:

Week 4

Open Week: Georgia State, New Mexico State, Troy

Players of the week:

Week 5

Open Week: Texas State

Players of the week:

Week 6

Open Week: Arkansas State, Georgia Southern, Idaho, South Alabama

Players of the week:

Week 7

Open Week: Louisiana-Lafayette, Texas State

Players of the week:

Week 8

Open Week: Georgia State

Players of the week:

Week 9

 Open Week: South Alabama

Players of the week:

Week 10

 Open Week: Georgia Southern

Players of the week:

Week 11

 Open Week: New Mexico State

Players of the week:

Week 12

 Open Week: Appalachian State, Arkansas State, Troy

Players of the week:

Week 13

Players of the week:

Week 14

Players of the week:

Bowl games
The Sun Belt had 4 guaranteed bowl tie-ins starting in 2015 with the addition of the Cure Bowl in Orlando, FL.
Arkansas State, Appalachian State, Georgia Southern, and Georgia State represented the Sun Belt during the 2015–16 bowl season; for the latter three teams, it would be their first bowl game.

Note: All times are local

Players of the Year
2013 Sun Belt Player of the Year awards

All-Sun Belt/American Team
Coaches All-Conference Selections

Honorable Mention: Appalachian State: Barrett Burns, Taylor Lamb, Doug Middleton, Devan Stringer; Arkansas State: Darion Griswold, Khari Lain, Robert Mondie, Dijon Paschal; Georgia State: Donovan Harden, Shawanye Lawrence, Alonzo McGee, Chandon Sullivan; Georgia Southern: Ironhead Gallon, L. A. Ramsby, Antwione Williams, Caleb Williams; Idaho: Buck Cowan, Matt Linehan, Elijhaa Penny, Jordan Rose ; Louisiana-Lafayette: Octravian Anderson, Elijah McGuire, Otha Peters, Chris Prater; Louisiana-Monroe: Trey Caldwell, Marcus Green, Michael Johnson, Colby Mitchell; New Mexico State: Stody Bradley, Isaiah Folasa, Anthony McMeans, Tyrian Taylor; Texas State: Adrian Bellard, Ryan Melton, Ryan Carden, Tyler Jones; South Alabama DeMarion Harper, Kalen Jackson, Xavier Johnson, Aleem Sunanon; Troy: Brandon Burks, Rashad Dillard, Antonio Garcia, Brandon Silvers.

Home attendance

References